Hereclean is a commune located in Sălaj County, Crișana, Romania. It is composed of six villages: Badon (Bádon), Bocșița (Magyarbaksa), Dioșod (Diósad), Guruslău (Magyargoroszló), Hereclean and Panic (Szilágypanit).

Sights 
 Wooden Church in Bocșița, built in the 17th century (1625), historic monument
 Reformed Church in Guruslău, completed in 1835
 Guruslău, Monument Mihai Viteazul, built in the 20th century (1976), historic monument
 Stejărișul Panic Nature reserve (2 ha)
 Stejărișul de baltă Panic Nature reserve (1.70 ha)

Politics 

Vasile Păcală was elected as the mayor in 2000 and 2004. Mayor Francisc Dobrai (born 1968, Dioșod) was elected the first time in 2008 as a member of the Democratic Alliance of Hungarians in Romania and re-elected in 2012. Before 2008, Dobrai had served as a local councilor for eight years.

2012 election 

The Hereclean Council, elected in the 2012 local government elections, is made up of 13 councilors, with the following party composition: 7-Democratic Alliance of Hungarians in Romania, 4-Social Liberal Union, 1-Democratic Liberal Party, 1-Hungarian Civic Party

2008 election 
The Hereclean Council, elected in the 2008 local government elections, is made up of 13 councilors, with the following party composition:

Gallery

See also 
 Battle of Guruslău
 Greek-Catholic Church in Badon

References

External links 
 Primaria Hereclean

Communes in Sălaj County
Localities in Crișana